Șinca is a commune in Brașov County, Transylvania, Romania. It is composed of six villages: Bucium (Bucsum), Ohaba (Ohába), Perșani (Persány), Șercăița (Sarkaica), Șinca Veche (the commune center) and Vâlcea (Valcsatelep).

References

Communes in Brașov County
Localities in Transylvania